The Commission on Human Rights and Administrative Justice is an independent governmental  organization charged with safeguarding of human rights and  investigating human rights abuses in Ghana. It was established in 1993 by Act 456 of the Parliament of Ghana as directed by Article 216 of the 1992 Ghana constitution.

Creation and composition
The 1992 Ghana Constitution directs the legislature to establish a commission with mandate to be The National Human Rights Institution of Ghana, the Ombudsman of Ghana and an Anti-Corruption Agency and Ethics Office for the Public Service of Ghana. The commission was duly establish in 1993 with the passage of the CHRAJ Act, Act 456.

The commission is made up of a commissioner and two deputy commissioners, who are appointed by the President of Ghana under Article 70 of the Ghanaian constitution. The commissioner must be qualified to be a Justice of the Appeal Court and the deputies must be eligible to be justices of the High Court. 

The first commissioner was Emile Short who retired in 2010, in 2004 he took an indefinite leave to serve as a Justice at the United Nations International Criminal Tribunal for Rwanda, his deputy Anna Bossman served as the acting commissioner in his absence.  He resume his post in 2009 and retired in 2010. Madam Lauretta Lamptey succeed him . In July 2012, Joseph Akanjoluer Whittal was sworn in by President John Atta Mills as a deputy commissioner. Joseph Whittal was appointed by President Mahama to replace Lauretta Lamptey in 2016.

The commission serves as an ombudsman receiving and dealing with complaints about the proper functioning of public institutions and to provide redress. It appears it can do same for private entities due to the way Article 218 (c) is written.

List of Commissioners

See also
Human rights commission

References

External links 
Commission on Human Rights and Administrative Justice
 Act 456 of the Parliament of Ghana

National human rights institutions
Organizations established in 1993
1993 establishments in Ghana
Human rights in Ghana